Greenacres is a city in Palm Beach County, Florida, United States. Situated in the east-central portion of the county, Greenacres is located northwest of Atlantis, east of Wellington, and borders Palm Springs to its east. As of the 2010 United States census, the city had a population of 37,573 people, up from 27,569 at the 2000 census. The Census Bureau estimated that 41,117 people reside in Greenacres as of 2019. It is a city within the Miami metropolitan area, which was home to an estimated 6,012,331 people as of 2015.

Frederick E. Bryant, Harold J. Bryant, and William Greenwood of the Palm Beach Farms Company began buying and selling thousands of acres of land in the area by 1909. However, difficulties with farming in wetland conditions left the land mostly unused until the 1920s land boom. Lawrence Carter "L. C." Swain then platted the original section of Greenacres beginning in 1923. The community was incorporated as Greenacres City on May 24, 1926, with the name being drawn out of a hat. The city was dis-incorporated under controversial circumstances in 1945, before being officially re-incorporated in 1947. The city's population remained small until rapid growth began in the 1970s. Residents voted to rename the community Greenacres in 1990.

Today, Greenacres is a diverse and relatively large community in terms of population. John I. Leonard High School, the largest high school in Palm Beach County and one of the largest in Florida, has been located in Greenacres since the city annexed the property in 1994.

History

In 1909, Frederick E. Bryant—a British agriculturalist—Harold J. Bryant, and William Greenwood of the Palm Beach Farms Company in Colorado, bought thousands of acres of land in the Everglades and later along the coast of Lake Worth in 1910. The men sold the land to buyers throughout the United States and Canada, offering  plots for $250, with a $10 down payment and a $10 per month charge, which also included a  parcel on the shore of Lake Worth. However, difficulties involved with farming in the Everglades forced 308 buyers to settle at their properties along Lake Worth, an area that would later become the city of Lake Worth. Until the land boom of the 1920s, these lots were effectively abandoned. Around that time, Lawrence Carter "L. C." Swain of Massachusetts acquired  of land, with the intention of creating a community for the working class. He initially platted approximately half of the land in 1923, with a plat just west of Military Trail becoming the original section of the city. By 1925, Swain began selling lots for $225.

The town was originally incorporated as Greenacres City on May 24, 1926. The name Greenacres was the winning entry in a local naming contest. Upon incorporating, the town had an estimated 1,250 residents. Swain also became honorary mayor, before the first officials were elected, which included J. H.  Southard as mayor, G. W. Simpson as clerk, A. P. Lane as marshal, and S. R. Allen, A. E. Fernell, Robert Hansen, C. Martin, I. E. Shivers, and F. L. Woods as aldermen. Additionally, G. W. Fleenor of Lake Worth became acting attorney. In September of that year, a hurricane destroyed the civic building and community hall, but did not cause much other significant damage. Two years later, Greenacres City was devastated by the 1928 Okeechobee hurricane, which damaged "practically every building" substantially, according to The Lake Worth Herald.

Swain died in 1944; Swain Boulevard and L. C. Swain Middle School are named in his honor. In 1945, about 125 residents petitioned for the Florida Legislature to abolish Greenacres City as a municipality. The legislature passed a bill to dis-incorporate Greenacres City in April of that year, which became a law on April 24, 1945, without the signature of Governor Millard Caldwell. Then-Mayor Charles A. Grabowski actively fought the new law, as no referendum to forfeit the town's charter had been held. Additionally, Grabowski accused a resident of starting the dissolution movement out of spite after being denied a homestead exemption and claimed that many of the signatories did not actually own property in Greenacres City. Grabowski also asserted that the pleas of city officials and a large number of residents in favor of remaining a town were ignored. On December 4, 1945, a meeting was held to reincorporate Greenacres City. A total of 86 out of 120 registered voters turned out, more than the two-thirds of voters quorum required. The 86 voters unanimously decided to reincorporate. The area's rights as a city were restored, while Greenacres City was officially reincorporated in 1947. Over the subsequent decades, Greenacres City eventually expanded to  through annexation. 

In the 1960s, a city hall complex was constructed at the intersection of Perry Avenue and Fourth Street, while a community center was built nearby. The city hall complex originally included a public library and all other city departments, except for the fire and public works departments. By the 1970s, full-time police and fire departments were established. In response to concerns about future growth, residents approved a bond referendum in 1984 to fund construction of a new city hall, a public safety complex, and recreational facilities. In 1990, about 60% of voters chose to drop the word "city" from the official name, thus renaming the municipality Greenacres. After the 1990 census indicated a population of 18,638, city council authorized a special census in 1993, which added more than 3,000 additional residents to the official population count, making Greenacres eligible for funds from the state government of Florida. To commemorate the city's 80th anniversary, the Greenacres Historical Society was formed in 2006, with a museum established two years later. In July 2007, construction was completed on a new city hall and public works facility on Melaleuca Lane.

Geography

Greenacres is located at  (26.628045, –80.135389).

Demographics

2020 census

As of the 2020 United States census, there were 43,990 people, 13,986 households, and 9,435 families residing in the city. The population density was 7,331.67 inhabitants per square mile (2,830.8/km2). The 17,927 housing units averaged 3,043.6 inhabitants per square mile (1,175.1/km2). Approximately 76.7% of residents of the city were age 18 and over.

2010 census
As of the 2010 census, 37,573 people, 17,249 households, and 14,384 families were residing in the city. The population density was 7,029.8 inhabitants per square mile (2,714.2/km2). The 17,249 housing units averaged 2,928.5 inhabitants per square mile (1,130.7/km2). The racial makeup of the city was 40.8% White, 17.0% African American, 0.7% Native American, 3.0% Asian, 0.1% Pacific Islander, 9.0% from other races, and 3.2% from two or more races. Hispanics or Latinos of any race were 38.3% of the population.

In the city, the age distribution was 16.6% at 65 or older, 24.8% was under 18, 7.6% from 18 to 24, 28.9% from 25 to 44, and 22.1% from 45 to 64; the median age was 36.3 years. For every 100 females, there were 90.6 males. For every 100 females age 18 and over, there were 86.6 males. Around 35.4% of the households in 2010 had children under the age of 18 living with them, 16.4% were married couples living together, 16.5% had a female householder with no spouse present, and 34.4% were not families. About 27.9% of all households were made up of one individual, and 32.4% had someone living alone who was 65 years of age or older. The average household size was 2.61, and the average family size was 3.17.

2000 census
As of the 2000 census, 27,569 people, 12,059 households, and 7,588 families were residing in the city. The population density was 5,917.6 inhabitants per square mile (2,284.8 /km2). The 14,153 housing units averaged 2,444.4 inhabitants per square mile (943.8 /km2). The racial makeup of the city was 83.2% White, 6.5% African American, 0.3% Native American, 1.8% Asian, less than 0.1% Pacific Islander, 5.6% from other races, and 2.5% from two or more races. Hispanics or Latinos of any race were 21.2% of the population.

The age distribution of the population was spread out in 2000, with 20.9% of the population were under the age of 18, 7.6% from 18 to 24, 28.5% from 25 to 44, 19.4% from 45 to 64, and 23.6% who were 65 years of age or older. The median age was 40 years. For every 100 females, there were 87.9 males. For every 100 females age 18 and over, there were 84.2 males. As of 2000, 24.5% had children under the age of 18 living with them, 45.9% were married couples living together, 12.5% had a female householder with no spouse present, and 37.1% were non-families. Approximately 29.7% of all households were made up of one individual, and 15.1% had someone living alone who was 65 years of age or older. The average household size was 2.29 and the average family size was 2.80.

As of 2000, speakers of English as a first language accounted for 73.64% of all residents, while Spanish accounted for 21.02%, Italian for 1.69%, French Creole made up 1.09%, German was at 0.71%, and French was the mother tongue for 0.45% of the population.

As of 2000, Greenacres had the ninety-ninth highest percentage of Cuban residents in the United States, with 2.41% of the populace (tied with Forest, Mississippi). It also had the ninety-seventh highest percentage of Colombian residents in the United states, at 1.67% of the city's population.

In 2000, the median household income was $36,941 and the median family income was $41,250. Males had a median income of $30,207 compared with $25,141 for females. The per capita income for the city was $19,298. About 5.0% of families and 7.2% of the population were below the poverty line, including 8.8% of those under age 18 and 6.5% of those age 65 or over.

Education
Public Elementary Schools
Cholee Lake Elementary School
Diamond View Elementary School
Greenacres Elementary School
Heritage Elementary School
Liberty Park Elementary School
Forest Hill Elementary School

Public Middle Schools
L. C. Swain Middle School
Okeeheelee Middle School
Tradewinds Middle School

Public High School
John I. Leonard High School

References

External links

Cities in Palm Beach County, Florida
Cities in Florida
1926 establishments in Florida
Populated places established in 1926